Dangshan railway station is a station on the Longhai railway in Dangshan County, Suzhou, Anhui.

History
The station was established in 1915.

References

Railway stations in Anhui
Stations on the Longhai Railway
Railway stations in China opened in 1915